A special election was held in  April 30-May 2, 1816 to fill a vacancy left by the resignation of Peter B. Porter (DR) on January 23, 1816 after being appointed a Commissioner under the Treaty of Ghent.  The special election was held at the same time as the general elections to the 15th Congress in New York.

Election results

Clarke took his seat December 2, 1816

See also
List of special elections to the United States House of Representatives
 1816 and 1817 United States House of Representatives elections

References

New York 1816 21
1816 21
New York 1816 21
New York 21
United States House of Representatives 21
United States House of Representatives 1816 21